Thirty-Three Teeth is a crime novel by British author Colin Cotterill and published in 2005 by Soho Press, New York.  It won the 2006 Dilys Award.

Plot summary
When the Malay Black bear vanishes from its cage in the zoo garden of Vientiane's Lan Xang Hotel very few people are surprised to see mauled bodies turning up in the morgue. Very few that is, apart from Dr. Siri Phaiboun the only coroner in the Lao People's Republic. Seventy-two-year-old Siri and his team are convinced something just doesn't add up.

In Luang Prabang, meanwhile, plans are afoot to finally rid the country of its royal heritage. The new socialist government is about to send the royal family to a re-education camp and exorcise the spirits of the old kings. Siri is sent to the historic capital to solve two mysteries: what killed a man found on a crumpled bicycle, and what caused the deaths of two bodies charred beyond recognition and missing their feet? What is so important that a military helicopter should be provided to whisk him north at a moment's notice?

Once there, Siri calls on his spiritual connections to help solve these cases. But he reawakens the souls of the phibob, the malevolent ghosts still seeking revenge on the doctor for past misdeeds. He enlists the help of the royal shaman and finally learns the true intentions of the phibob and of his own distinguished dynasty. Before he can return to his work he has to survive the phibob attempt on his life, unmask the betrayer of the king and argue his own defense against charges of treachery.

With Siri out of town, it is left to Dtui his nursing assistant to investigate the killings in Vientiane. She has her first unpleasant encounter with a Russian circus trainer, gets access to secret Party files, and soon becomes the only person in Laos arguing against the death warrant on the old Malay bear. But whilst searching for who or whatever it is murdering women and draining them of their blood, Dtui disappears.

With the moon full, and three victims already on the morgue slab, Dr. Siri has four hours to find his assistant before she becomes the fourth.

Awards and nominations
Thirty-Three Teeth won the 2006 Dilys Award presented by the Independent Mystery Booksellers Association.

Notes

External links
Aust Crime Fiction Thirty-Three Teeth Review

2005 British novels
American crime novels
Novels set in Laos
Dilys Award-winning works
Soho Press books